Ariadne von Schirach  (born 1978 in Munich) is a German philosopher, writer, journalist and critic. She is known as a literary critic for Deutschlandradio Kultur, and as an essayist and columnist for newspapers such as Die Welt and Frankfurter Allgemeine Zeitung.

She studied philosophy, psychology and sociology at LMU, the Free University of Berlin and the Humboldt University of Berlin. She teaches philosophy and chinese thinking at the Berlin University of the Arts, the Hochschule für Bildende Künste Hamburg and the Donau-Universität Krems since 2012. In 2007 she published the book Der Tanz um die Lust, about the consequences of an increasingly sexualized society, which became a bestseller. In 2014 she published her second book, Du sollst nicht funktionieren: Für eine neue Lebenskunst. 2016 she published the psychoanalytical textbook Ich und du und Müllers Kuh. Kleine Charakterkunde für alle, die sich selbst und andere besser verstehen wollen. After Der Tanz um die Lust, 2007 and Du sollst nicht funktionieren. Für eine neue Lebenskunst, 2014 she published 2019 Die psychotische Gesellschaft. Wie wir Angst und Ohnacht überwinden, the final book of this Trilogy of Modern Life.

Schirach is a member of the Sorbian Schirach family and is a daughter of the sinologist Richard von Schirach and a granddaughter of the Nazi youth leader and war criminal Baldur von Schirach. She is a cousin of the lawyer and bestselling crime writer Ferdinand von Schirach and the sister of the novelist Benedict Wells.

Books 
 Der Tanz um die Lust, Goldmann, Munich, 2007, 
 Du sollst nicht funktionieren: Für eine neue Lebenskunst, Klett-Cotta, Stuttgart, 2014, 
 Ich und du und Müllers Kuh. Kleine Charakterkunde für alle, die sich selbst und andere besser verstehen wollen, Klett-Cotta, Stuttgart, 2016, 
 Die psychotische Gesellschaft. Wie wir Angst und Ohnmacht überwinden, Tropen Verlag, Stuttgart, 2019,

References 

German women writers
German journalists
German philosophers
21st-century German writers
Ariadne
German people of Sorbian descent
German people of American descent
Living people
1978 births
21st-century German women